Champlain College is a private, coeducational college located in Burlington, Vermont, United States.

Champlain College may also refer to:

Champlain Regional College, an English-language, publicly funded pre‑university college in Quebec, Canada
Champlain College Saint-Lambert, Champlain Regional College campus serving the Greater Montreal Area
Champlain College Lennoxville, Champlain Regional College campus serving the Eastern Townships
Champlain College St. Lawrence, Champlain Regional College campus serving Quebec City
Champlain College at Trent University in Peterborough, Ontario, Canada

See also 
 Champlain (disambiguation)